Statue of Walter Scott may refer to:

 Statue of Sir Walter Scott, Perth
 Statue of Walter Scott (New York City)
 Scott Monument, Edinburgh

See also
 Scott Statue (disambiguation)